Lutsk  is an air base of the Ukrainian Air Force located near Lutsk, Volyn Oblast, Ukraine. Previously closed in 2006, the air base was reopened for works in 2014 and since 2018 housed the 204th Tactical Aviation Brigade that currently operates Mikoyan MiG-29M/UB and Aero L-39C Albatross aircraft.

History
It was home to 806th Fighter-Bomber Aviation Regiment (806 APIB) which flew Su-17 aircraft as recently as 1992. It currently serves as storage base for Sukhoi Su-24 bombers. From 1945 to 1992, the regiment was part of the 289th Division of the 57th Air Army, then the 14th Air Army, then the Air Forces of the Carpathian Military District, then the 14th Air Army once more. The airport use was abandoned in 2006. In 2018 it was revived and became the home of the 204th Tactical Aviation Brigade, which was before the 2014 Russian annexation of Crimea based in Belbek Airport.

The base was the target of Russian airstrikes by Russian armed forces on 27 February and 11 March 2022. In the first attack two aircraft resembling Su-24 were destroyed according to commercial satellite imagery, however, there were no Su-24s deployed with the unit based at the airbase.

References

Holm, 806th Bomber Aviation Regiment, accessed August 2011

Buildings and structures destroyed during the 2022 Russian invasion of Ukraine
2022 disestablishments in Ukraine
Airports disestablished in 2022
Soviet Air Force bases
Soviet Frontal Aviation
Ukrainian airbases
Defunct airports in Ukraine
Buildings and structures in Lutsk